John Anderson (January 27, 1855 – November 8, 1930) was a businessman, politician, and a city councillor of St. John's City Council and member of the Newfoundland House of Assembly. He was instrumental in the passing of the Daylight Saving Act of 1917.

Anderson was born in Saltcoats, Scotland and educated at Saltcoats Academy. He came to Newfoundland in 1875 and joined the firm of James Baird in St. John's. He served on St. John's City Council from 1900 to 1904 and was elected to the House of Assembly around the same time. Anderson became fascinated with the idea of daylight saving time (DST) after meeting William Willett who had been promoting it in England. His advocacy for the bill to enact DST earned the sobriquet Anderson's Time. Newfoundland became the first jurisdiction in North America to adopt DST.

Anderson was the father of theater producer and screenwriter John Murray Anderson and playwright Captain Hugh Abercrombie Anderson, a member of Order of the British Empire who wrote the musical Auld Lang Syne.

See also
List of people of Newfoundland and Labrador

External links

History of Daylight Saving Time
Information on Anderson in article

1855 births
1930 deaths
Newfoundland Colony people
St. John's, Newfoundland and Labrador city councillors
Scottish emigrants to pre-Confederation Newfoundland
People from Saltcoats
Dominion of Newfoundland people